The Young Man and Moby Dick is a 1979 Czechoslovakian drama film directed by Jaromil Jireš. It was entered into the 11th Moscow International Film Festival.

Cast
 Ivan Vyskočil as Bretislav Laboutka
 Eduard Cupák as Viktor Panc
 Jana Brejchová as Edita Beningerová
 Zlata Adamovská as Nada
 Jana Andresíková as Worker
 Zdeněk Blažek as Ferryman Gauss
 Bohuslav Čáp as Worker
 Karel Heřmánek as Udo Vízner

References

External links
 

1979 films
1979 drama films
1970s Czech-language films
Films directed by Jaromil Jireš
Czechoslovak drama films
1970s Czech films